I Love the '90s is a television mini-series and the fourth installment of the I Love the... series produced by VH1 in which various music and TV personalities talk about the 1990s culture and all it had to offer. The show premiered July 12, 2004, with the episode "I Love 1990" and aired two episodes daily until July 16, 2004, when it ended with "I Love 1999".  On January 17, 2005, a sequel (named I Love the '90s: Part Deux) was aired in the same fashion.

Commentators

Carlos Alazraqui
Art Alexakis
Jamal Anderson
Greg Anthony
Sebastian Bach
Diedrich Bader
Barenaked Ladies (Steven Page and Ed Robertson)
Lance Bass
Rachel Bilson
Michael Ian Black
Michael Bolton
Chris Booker
Vinnie Brown
Michael Bublé
Ray Buchanan
Thomas Calabro
Jerry Cantrell
Gabrielle Carteris
Lacey Chabert
JC Chasez
Mystro Clark
Gary Cole
Coolio
Molly Culver
Erin Daniels
Keith David
Terrell Davis
Simon Doonan
Kyan Douglas
Dr. Ruth
Bill Dwyer
Rich Eisen
Christine Elise
Missy Elliot
Craig Ferguson
Greg Fitzsimmons
Jake Fogelnest
Amanda Foreman
Doug E. Fresh
Willie Garson
Peri Gilpin
Jaime Gleicher
Godfrey
Macy Gray
Greg Grunberg
Bob Guiney
Luis Guzmán
MC Hammer
Hanson
Rachael Harris
Melissa Joan Hart
Hulk Hogan
Scott Ian
Ice-T
Jane's Addiction (Dave Navarro and Stephen Perkins)
Chris Jericho
Amy Jo Johnson
Walter Jones
Kato Kaelin
Aaron Karo
Wendy Kaufman
Jordan Knight
John Kricfalusi
A.J. Langer
Ben Lee
Bobby Lee
Lit (Kevin Baldes & A. Jay Popoff and Jeremy Popoff & Allen Shellenberger)
Beth Littleford
Jeremy London
Loni Love
Stephen Lynch
Cindy Margolis
Constance Marie
Maroon 5 (Jesse Carmichael and Adam Levine)
John Mayer
Edwin McCain
Darryl McDaniels
Joey McIntyre
Sarah McLachlan
Jason Mewes
Bret Michaels
Kylie Minogue
Colin Mochrie
Modern Humorist (Michael Colton and John Aboud)
Dominic Monaghan
Warren Moon
Tom Morello
Scotty Morris
Jason Mraz
Eric Nies
John O'Hurley
Patrice O'Neal
John Ondrasik
Jenna Von Oy
Jared Padalecki
Brian Palermo
Tom Papa
Petros Papadakis
Trey Parker
Mario Van Peebles
Liz Phair
Chris Pontius
Brian Posehn
Kevin Powell
Susan Powter
Chris Pratt
Megyn Price
Missi Pyle
Rachel Quaintance
Robert Randolph
Alfonso Ribeiro
Brad Roberts
Mo Rocca
The Roots (Black Thought and Questlove)
David Lee Roth
Darius Rucker
Antonio Sabato, Jr.
Faith Salie
Andrea Savage
Steven Scott
Stuart Scott
Jane Seymour
Shannon Sharpe
Vonda Shepard
Sir Mix-A-Lot
DJ Skribble
Kerr Smith
Kevin Smith
Dee Snider
Hal Sparks
Jerry Springer
Spin Doctors (Aaron Comess and Chris Barron)
Scott Stapp
Joel Stein
Mindy Sterling
Heidi Strobel
Joe E. Tata
James Michael Tyler
Blair Underwood
Brian Unger
Usher
Gillian Vigman
Jack Wagner
Billy West
Jaleel White
Steve Wilkos
Kellie Williams
Venus Williams
Mykelti Williamson
Tony Woods
Ian Ziering
Daphne Zuniga

Recurring segments
 Uncut and Uncensored: Each commentator gives their additional opinion on a topic that was covered in its respective year.
 Dance Songs: MC Hammer looks back on some of the year's best dance songs.
 Dirty Alternative Rockers: Liz Phair lists the male alternative rock artists for each year.
 Wendy the Snapple Lady Answers Viewer Mail: Wendy Kaufman receives mail from viewers in each year.
 Hotties: Michael Bolton presents the top female entertainment personalities for the year.
 Rename Your Favorite TV Show: Jay & Silent Bob rename each year's favorite TV show.
 Final Thought: In a parody of the closing segment of the same name from his eponymous talk show, Jerry Springer gives his final thoughts on each year at the end of the episode.
 During the credits of every episode, a clip from a popular music video was played without any type of commentary. These were usually replaced with a show promo by VH1.

Topics covered by year

1990
 Pretty Woman
 Twin Peaks
 "Nothing Compares 2 U" by Sinéad O'Connor
 Marion Barry is caught smoking crack
 Ghost
 Jack Kevorkian's controversial suicide technique
 "The Humpty Dance" by Digital Underground
 MC Hammer and Vanilla Ice
 The Forbidden Dance and Lambada
 "How Am I Supposed to Live Without You" by Michael Bolton (originally released in 1989; Previously mentioned in an I Love the '80s Strikes Back segment.)
 "I've fallen and I can't get up!"
 "Groove Is in the Heart" by Deee-Lite
 Guess jeans 
 Dances with Wolves
 In Living Color
 "Hold On" by Wilson Phillips
 Edward Scissorhands
 Slap bracelets
 Goodfellas

Uncut and Uncensored: Michael Ian Black on Marion Barry

Dance Songs of 1990: "Pump Up the Jam" by Technotronic, "Everybody, Everybody" by Black Box and "Vogue" by Madonna

Dirty Alternative Rockers of 1990: Black Francis, Jane's Addiction and Mike Patton

Hotties of 1990: Christina Applegate, Robin Givens and Nicole Kidman

Rename Your Favorite TV Show of 1990: In Living Color (Watch Jim Carrey Keep It Real for Whitey and Burn Victims)

Final Thought on 1990: "Ice Ice Baby", Lambada and In Living Color

1991
 Beverly Hills, 90210 (originally premiered in 1990)
 Boyz n the Hood
 The Clarence Thomas/Anita Hill sexual harassment hearings
 Grunge
 New Jack City
 Color Me Badd
 Bugle Boy jeans
 "Rico Suave" by Gerardo
 Thelma & Louise
 Family Matters (originally premiered in 1989)
 Pee-Wee Herman caught masturbating
 Super Bowl XXV and Wide Right
 "Enter Sandman" by Metallica
 Point Break 
 “Gonna Make You Sweat (Everybody Dance Now)” by C+C Music Factory (originally released in 1990)
 Rollerblades
 Garth Brooks
 The Silence of the Lambs

Uncut and Uncensored: Michael Ian Black on Clarence Thomas

Dance Songs of 1991: "Gypsy Woman (She's Homeless)" by Crystal Waters, "Tom's Diner" by Suzanne Vega and DNA and "Unbelievable" by EMF

Dirty Alternative Rockers of 1991: Eddie Vedder, Krist Novoselic and Kim Thayil

Hotties of 1991: Pamela Anderson, Naomi Campbell and Chynna Phillips

Rename Your Favorite TV Show of 1991: Family Matters (Black Nerd Says the Darndest Thing to That Twinkie-Eating Cop from "Die Hard")

Final Thought on 1991: Boyz n the Hood, Beverly Hills, 90210, Paul Reubens scandal, Clarence Thomas and Naughty by Nature

1992
 Wayne's World
 The Amy Fisher and Joey Buttafuoco affair
 "Achy Breaky Heart" by Billy Ray Cyrus
 Ross Perot
 "I'm Too Sexy" by Right Said Fred (originally released in 1991)
 Fabio
 The Real World
 Woody Allen's affair with his stepdaughter
 Kris Kross
 Madonna publishes Sex
 "Baby Got Back" by Sir Mix-a-Lot
 The Dream Team
 The Ren & Stimpy Show (originally premiered in 1991)
 Murphy Brown (originally premiered in 1988)
 Single White Female
 Arrested Development
 Reservoir Dogs
 Mortal Kombat
 Barney & Friends
 The "Dan & Dave" campaign by Reebok
 The Bodyguard

Dance Songs of 1992: "Move This" by Technotronic, "Humpin' Around" by Bobby Brown and "Finally" by CeCe Peniston

Dirty Alternative Rockers of 1992: Thurston Moore, Lenny Kravitz and Red Hot Chili Peppers

Uncut and Uncensored: Billy West on Ren and Stimpy

Rename Your Favorite TV Show of 1992: Murphy Brown (Stupid Show You Couldn't Pay Us to Watch About Some Old Lady)

Hotties of 1992: Michelle Pfeiffer, Rebecca De Mornay and Annabella Sciorra

Final Thought on 1992: "Baby Got Back", Ross Perot and Joey Buttafuoco

1993
 Jurassic Park
 Marge Schott
 "Informer" by Snow (originally released in 1992)
 Where's Waldo? (originally published in 1987)
 Martin (originally premiered in 1992)
 Free Willy
 John and Lorena Bobbitt
 "No Rain" by Blind Melon
 The Fugitive
 The Waco Siege
 Dr. Quinn, Medicine Woman
 Dr. Dre and Snoop Dogg
 Mighty Morphin Power Rangers
 Dazed and Confused
 Crystal Pepsi 
 Quantum Leap (originally premiered in 1989)
 Aerosmith's music video trilogy with Alicia Silverstone
 The X-Files

Dance Songs of 1993: "Whoomp! (There It Is)" by Tag Team, "What Is Love" by Haddaway and "Rhythm is a Dancer" by Snap!

Dirty Alternative Rockers of 1993: Henry Rollins, Evan Dando and J Mascis

Uncut and Uncensored: Godfrey on Dr. Quinn, Medicine Woman

Rename Your Favorite TV Show of 1993: The X-Files (Dork Porn Where Some Redhead is Hot and the Aliens Are Really Lame)

Hotties of 1993: Teri Hatcher, Meg Ryan and Demi Moore

Final Thought on 1993: Free Willy, John & Lorena Bobbitt and Bill Clinton

1994
 Melrose Place (originally premiered in 1992)
 The attack on Nancy Kerrigan
 Reality Bites and "Stay (I Missed You)" by Lisa Loeb
 John Tesh becomes a musician
 Speed
 The O.J. Simpson Bronco chase
 NYPD Blue (originally premiered in 1993)
 "Mmm Mmm Mmm Mmm" by Crash Test Dummies (originally released in 1993)
 George Foreman's comeback
 Boyz II Men
 Tommy Hilfiger
 Pulp Fiction
 Ace of Base
 Woodstock '94
 Salt-n-Pepa
 Forrest Gump

Uncut and Uncensored: Modern Humorist on "Stay"

Dance Songs of 1994: "100% Pure Love" by Crystal Waters, "Tootsee Roll" by 69 Boyz and "Cantaloop (Flip Fantasia)" by Us3

Dirty Alternative Rockers of 1994: Beck, Chris Cornell and Trent Reznor

Hotties of 1994: Jennifer Love Hewitt, Cameron Diaz and Tiffani-Amber Thiessen

Rename Your Favorite TV Show of 1994: Melrose Place (90210 But with a Pool)

Final Thought on 1994: Tonya Harding vs. Nancy Kerrigan, George Foreman Grill and Forrest Gump

1995
 Toy Story
 Party of Five (originally premiered in 1994)
 "Gangsta's Paradise" by Coolio and L.V.
 Snapple 
 Waterworld
 Hugh Grant caught with prostitute Divine Brown
 M&M's spokescandies commercials 
 Heroin chic
 TLC
 Clueless
 "Cotton Eye Joe" by Rednex (originally released in 1994)
 Xena: Warrior Princess and Hercules: The Legendary Journeys
 Tattoos and piercings
 Babe
 PlayStation 
 Chat rooms and cybersex
 X Games and MTV Sports (originally premiered in 1992)
 Hootie & the Blowfish
 Braveheart

Dance Songs of 1995: "Everlasting Love" by Gloria Estefan, "Total Eclipse of the Heart" by Nicki French and "This is How We Do It" by Montell Jordan

Dirty Alternative Rockers of 1995: Gavin Rossdale, Scott Weiland and Billie Joe Armstrong

Hotties of 1995: Shirley Manson, Holly Robinson and Gabrielle Reece

Rename Your Favorite TV Show of 1995: Party of Five (5 Whiny Bitches That Complain About How Their Parents Got Killed in an Accident)

Uncut and Uncensored: Craig Ferguson on Babe

Final Thought on 1995: Hootie and the Blowfish, chat rooms, heroin chic, the Rachel haircut, X Games, and tattoos and piercings

1996
 The Macarena (originally released in 1993)
 Oakland Ebonics controversy
 Twister
 The Nanny (originally premiered in 1993)
 Tickle Me Elmo
 Oasis
 Independence Day
 Bob Dole
 Zubaz
 Tiger Woods and Dennis Rodman
 Mentos commercials
 "C'mon N' Ride It (The Train)" by Quad City DJs
 Alanis Morissette's Jagged Little Pill album (originally released in 1995)
 Kathie Lee Gifford's child labor scandal
 Sling Blade
 "One of Us" by Joan Osborne (originally released in 1995)
 Jerry Maguire

Dance Songs of 1996: "Missing" (Todd Terry Remix) by Everything but the Girl, "No Diggity" by Blackstreet featuring Dr. Dre and "Be My Lover" by La Bouche

Dirty Alternative Rockers of 1996: Zack de la Rocha, John Rzeznik and Billy Corgan

Hotties of 1996: Brooke Shields, Gwyneth Paltrow and Gwen Stefani

Rename Your Favorite TV Show of 1996: The Nanny (The "Old Navy" Hot Chick with the Annoying Voice)

Uncut and Uncensored: Hal Sparks on Karl and Forrest

Final Thought on 1996: Jerry Maguire, "One of Us" and the Macarena

1997
 Austin Powers: International Man of Mystery
 Spice Girls
 McCaughey septuplets
 "Tubthumping" by Chumbawamba
 The Full Monty
 Hanson
 Dolly the Sheep
 Beanie Babies 
 Boogie Nights
 Fiona Apple
 Tamagotchi 
 Jewel
 Ally McBeal
 "Barbie Girl" by Aqua
 Lilith Fair
 Holyfield-Tyson II
 The Heaven's Gate cult suicide
 South Park

Dance Songs of 1997: "Hippychick" by Soho, "The Rhythm of the Night" by Corona and "Beautiful Life" by Ace of Base

Uncut and Uncensored: Craig Ferguson on Beanie Babies

Dirty Alternative Rockers of 1997: Thom Yorke, Damon Albarn and Fatboy Slim

Rename Your Favorite TV Show of 1997: South Park (Why Didn't We Come Up with this Show and Make Millions of Dollars)

Hotties of 1997: Nicollette Sheridan, Toni Braxton and Ashley Judd

Final Thought on 1997: Spice Girls, Ally McBeal, Tyson vs. Holyfield II and "How Bizarre"

1998
 Clinton–Lewinsky scandal
 Viagra
 John Glenn's return to space
 Armageddon
 "Gettin' Jiggy Wit It" by Will Smith
 Teletubbies (originally premiered in 1997)
 Backstreet Boys
 Dawson's Creek
 "Torn" by Natalie Imbruglia
 The Jerry Springer Show (originally premiered in 1991)
 Jesse Ventura becomes governor of Minnesota
 "The Dope Show" by Marilyn Manson
 Furby
 The Big Lebowski
 Swing revival
 Mark McGwire vs. Sammy Sosa
 Frasier (originally premiered in 1993)
 Martha Stewart
 Soccer moms
 "Make 'Em Say Uhh!" by Master P, Fiend, Silkk the Shocker, Mia X and Mystikal
 There's Something About Mary

Uncut and Uncensored: Rachael Harris on Monica Lewinsky

Dance Songs of 1998: "If You Could Read My Mind" by Stars on 54, "Nobody's Supposed to Be Here" (Dance Mix) by Deborah Cox and "Ray of Light" by Madonna

Dirty Alternative Rockers of 1998: Everlast, Fred Durst and Jonathan Davis

Hotties of 1998: Carmen Electra, Faith Hill, and Lauryn Hill

Rename Your Favorite TV Show of 1998: Dawson's Creek (90210 on a Creek)

Final Thought on 1998: Swing revival, Clinton–Lewinsky scandal, The Jerry Springer Show, There's Something About Mary, "Gettin' Jiggy Wit It" and Teletubbies

1999
 The Blair Witch Project
 Tae Bo
 Who Wants To Be A Millionaire (covered again in I Love the 2000s)
 "Summer Girls" by LFO
 Y2K
 Fight Club
 The Taco Bell chihuahua
 John Rocker
 The Sixth Sense
 Harry Potter 
 Latin pop explosion, specifically Ricky Martin, Enrique Iglesias, and Marc Anthony
 Elián González gets deported back to Cuba
 "Mambo No. 5" by Lou Bega
 Office Space
 Susan Lucci breaks the Daytime Emmy curse after nineteen consecutive nominations
 Teen pop explosion, specifically Britney Spears, Christina Aguilera, Mandy Moore, and Jessica Simpson
 The Atkins Diet
 The Matrix

Dance Songs of 1999: "Waiting for Tonight" by Jennifer Lopez, "Believe" by Cher and "Music Sounds Better with You" by Stardust

Dirty Alternative Rockers of 1999: Mark Hoppus, Brandon Boyd and Kid Rock

Hotties of 1999: Anna Kournikova, Shania Twain and Shannon Elizabeth

Rename Your Favorite TV Show of 1999: Who Wants to Be a Millionaire (Who Doesn't Want to Be a Millionaire)

Uncut and Uncensored: Jane's Addiction on the '90s

Final Thought on 1999: Susan Lucci, "Mambo No. 5" and computer downloads

External links
 
 I Love The 90's on Internet Archive.

Nostalgia television shows
Nostalgia television in the United States
VH1 original programming
2000s American television miniseries
2004 American television series debuts
2004 American television series endings